Carex polyantha, commonly known as river sedge, is a tussock-forming species of perennial sedge in the family Cyperaceae. It is native to eastern parts of Australia.

The species is found along the eastern coast of Australia from Queensland in the north then south through coastal areas of New South Wales, eastern parts of Victoria and in Tasmania. In Victoria it is found in the Goldfirlds, Riverina, Gippsland, Volcanic Plains grassland and  Victorian Alps.

See also
List of Carex species

References

polyantha
Taxa named by Ferdinand von Mueller
Plants described in 1855
Flora of New South Wales
Flora of Queensland
Flora of Victoria (Australia)
Flora of Tasmania